Waterfall  is a small village in County Cork, Ireland. It is located just south of Cork city in the parish of Ballinora. It is built on the L2230 road, connecting Crossbarry to the city. There is a pub on the Crossbarry side of the village. The West Cork Railway once went past Waterfall.  A railway bridge is still in place on the road leading to Ballinora. The local Gaelic Athletic Association team is Ballinora GAA club.

There is another village called Waterfall on the Beara Peninsula in western County Cork.

See also
 List of towns and villages in Ireland
 Waterfall (CBR) railway station

References

Towns and villages in County Cork